Rwanda and Juliet is a post-Rwandan genocide documentary by Canadian producer Ben Proudfoot.

Plot 
The film follows the trip of Dartmouth College professor emeritus Andrew Garrod to Kigali where he tries to enlist descendants of the Hutu and Tutsi into performing the Shakespearean classic with hope that it could lead to their reconciliation.

Reception 
The film has been added to the curriculum of British Universities Film & Video Council. It has been screened at Meredith College, the student association of the USC Shoah Foundation.

Festivals and screenings 
2016 Rwanda Film Festival

2016 Wisconsin Film Festival

Awards 
The film won the best documentary at the 16th annual Phoenix Film Festival.

References 

Documentary films about Rwanda
Canadian documentary films
Documentary films about theatre